Skoghalls IF was a sports club in Skoghall, Sweden, established in 1919. The club ran association football and bandy. The men's bandy team played in the Swedish top division in 1940., 1942, 1946 and 1947.

The men's soccer team played seven seasons in the Swedish third division.

In 1963, the club merged with Vidöns IK to form IFK Skoghall.

References 

Association football clubs established in 1919
Bandy clubs established in 1919
Defunct bandy clubs in Sweden
Defunct football clubs in Sweden
Sport in Värmland County
Sports clubs disestablished in 1963
1963 disestablishments in Sweden